The 2013–14 season is Omonia's 59th season in the Cypriot First Division and 65th year in existence as a football club.

Season overview

Pre-season
On 20 June 2013, over 2,500 fans attended to the first official training session for the season at Ilias Poullos Training Center. The pre-season tour was held once again in Opalenica, Poland and the team played four friendlies against Lech Poznań, Wisła Kraków, Hapoel Tel Aviv and Widzew Łódź. When returning to Cyprus and one week before the start of Europa League, Omonia played a friendly against the Greek side Skoda Xanthi in GSP Stadium and won 3-1.

Cypriot First Division
On 31 August, the team is playing the first league game of the season against Anorthosis in Antonis Papadopoulos, Larnaca.

Cypriot Cup
The team is entering the 2013–14 Cypriot Cup in late fall 2013.

UEFA Europa League
Omonia entered the second qualifying round of the 2013–14 UEFA Europa League. The team were drawn against the Romanian side FC Astra Giurgiu and managed to get 1-1 away in Arena Națională after an equalizer from João Paulo Andrade in the second half. A week later, over 18,000 tickets were sold  when the second leg was played in GSP Stadium but our team lost 1-2 and were therefore eliminated in the tournament.

Current squad
Last Update: 19 July 2013

For recent transfers, see List of Cypriot football transfers summer 2013.

Out on loan

 (to Enosis Neon Paralimniou until May 2014)

Active internationals

Foreign players

Squad changes

In:

Total expenditure:  €0

Out:

Total income:  €1,2M
{|

Squad stats

Top scorers

Last updated: 26 July 2013
Source: Match reports in Competitive matches, omonoia.com.cy

Captains
  Leandro
  Bruno Aguiar

Pre-season and friendlies

Competitions

Overall

Cypriot First Division

Classification

Results summary

Results by round

Matches
Kick-off times are in EET.

Regular season

Play-offs
The first 12 teams are divided into 2 groups. Points are carried over from the regular season.

Championship group

Results

UEFA Europa League

Third qualifying round

Cypriot Cup

First round

Second round

Quarter-finals

References

AC Omonia seasons
Omonia